Chaudhary (or Choudhary; also: Chaudhuri, Choudhuary, Chowdhury) is a common surname in the Indian subcontinent, originally derived from an Indian hereditary title. 'Chaudhary' was first bestowed by the various rulers of the Delhi Sultanate, and the custom was continued by the breakaway Bengal Sultanate. Later, the Mughals and the Nawabs conferred the same title in great numbers. Chaudharies were "local magnates" responsible for land taxes alongside an amil (revenue collector) and a karkun (accountant) in the local-level administrative units known as parganas.

Chaudhary

Business
Binod Chaudhary (1955-), a Nepalese businessman, industrialist, philanthropist, and politician

Acting, modeling and entertainment
Raja Chaudhary (1975-), an Indian television actor, writer and producer
Gaurav Chaudhary (1991-), an Indian YouTuber, media personality, and engineer
Ajay Chaudhary, an Indian television actor and model
Yuvika Chaudhary (1983-), an Indian actress
Meenakshi Chaudhary, is an Indian model
Basanta Chowdhury (1928-2000), an Indian actor
Saket Chaudhary, an Indian screenwriter and director
Sakshi Chaudhary (1993), an Indian model and actress from Dehradun, Uttarakhand
Aadesh Chaudhary, an Indian television actor
Parul Chaudhary, an Indian television actress
Urvashi Chaudhary (1986-), an Indian actress and model 
Raj Singh Chaudhary, an Indian actor
Ksshitij Chaudhary, an Indian Punjabi film director
Hema Chaudhary (1955-), an Indian actress in Kannada, Telugu, Malayalam, and Tamil films
Aastha Chaudhary, an Indian actress
Arav Chaudhary, an Indian actor
Ankush Choudhary, Indian actor, screenwriter, director, producer and theatre personality in Marathi cinema

Politics
Chaudhary Brahm Prakash Yadav-First Chief Minister of Delhi.
Chaudhary Harmohan Singh Yadav-He was an Indian educationist, social worker, independence activist, and an politician from Samajwadi Party.
Sarveen Choudhary - She is the cabinet minister in Bharatiya Janata Party ministry in Himachal Pradesh holding Urban, Town & Country Planning departments.
Babulal Chaudhary (1948-), an Indian Bharatiya Janata Party politician
Haribhai Parthibhai Chaudhary (1954-), an Indian politician and Minister of State for Coal and Mines
Ejaz Chaudhary (1956-), a prominent Pakistani politician, social worker, civil engineer
P. P. Chaudhary (1953-), a Union Minister of State
Chaudhary Laxmi Narayan Singh, an Indian politician from Uttar Pradesh
Balram Singh Yadav-He was an Indian politician from Uttar Pradesh.
Sukhram Singh Yadav, an Indian politician. He was the Chairman of the Uttar Pradesh Legislative Council from 2004 to 2010
Shanta Chaudhary, a social reformer and Former Member of Constituent Assembly of Nepal
Chaudhary Manisha Ashok, an Indian politician and member of the Bharatiya Janata Party
Satveer Chaudhary (1969-), an American politician
Amarsinh Chaudhary (1941–2004), an Indian politician
Jayant Chaudhary, an Indian politician from Mathura
Lal Singh Chaudhary (politician) (1959-), an Indian politician from Jammu and Kashmir
Chhotu Ram Chaudhary, an Indian politician of the Bharatiya Janata Party
Balbir Prasad Chaudhary, a Nepali politician 
Hemlata Chaudhary, an Indian politician from Uttar Pradesh
Tushar Amarsinh Chaudhary (1965-), an Indian politician of the Indian National Congress in Gujarat
Shankar Chaudhary (1970-), an Indian politician from Gujarat
Chaudhary Mohammad Akbar Ibrahim, Minister of Tourism, Wildlife & Environment in Azad Kashmir
Bhairaram Chaudhary, an Indian politician from the Bharatiya Janata Party from Rajasthan
Arun Chaudhary, an American political operative and filmmaker
Manibhai Chaudhary (1947-) an Indian politician of the Bharatiya Janata Party
Aruna Chaudhary, an Indian politician of Indian National Congress from Punjab
Chaudhary Yashpal Singh (–2015), an Indian politician
Dayaram Chaudhary, an Indian politician from Uttar Pradesh
R. K. Chaudhary, an Indian politician and former Minister of Roadways, Health
Roop Chaudhary, an Indian politician and member of the Bharatiya Janata Party from Uttar Pradesh
Genda Lal Chaudhary, an Indian politician representing Hathras
Nisha Chaudhary (1952-), a social worker and politician representing Sabarkantha
Bhupendra Chaudhary, state minister of Uttar Pradesh
Vijay Kumar Chaudhary (1957-) an Indian politician from Bihar
Arvind Kumar Chaudhary, an Indian politician of the Bahujan Samaj Party
Sanjay Chaudhary, an Indian politician of the Bharatiya Janata Party
Laxmilal Chaudhary, a Nepalese politician of the Nepal Loktantrik Samajbadi Dal
Amar Singh Chaudhary, an Indian politician of the Siddharth Nagar district, Uttar Pradesh
Birendra Kumar Chaudhary, an Indian politician from Jhanjharpur (Lok Sabha constituency)
Chaudhary Nand Lal, an Indian politician from Punjab
Chaudhary Randhir Singh (1924-), an Indian freedom fighter and politician
Ram Prasad Chaudhary, an Indian politician from Uttar Pradesh
Chaudhary Darshan Lal, an Indian politician from Punjab
Vidya Sagar Chaudhary, an Indian politician of the Bharatiya Janata Party from Himachal Pradesh

Sports
Anil Chaudhary (umpire) (1965-), an Indian cricket umpire
Saurabh Chaudhary (2002-), an Indian Sport Shooter
Garima Chaudhary (1990-), an Indian judoka
Ishwar Chaudhary (1988-), an Indian cricketer
Shweta Chaudhry (1986), an Indian shooter
Harendra Chaudhary (1976-), an Indian cricketer
Aditya Chaudhary (1996-), a footballer from Nepal
Shivam Chaudhary (1997-), an Indian cricketer
Vijay Chaudhary, an Indian wrestler
Dipendra Chaudhary (1980-), a Nepalese cricketer
Nikhil Chaudhary (cricketer) (1996-), an Indian cricketer
Sachin Chaudhary (1983-), an Indian powerlifter
Nilesh Chaudhary (1983-), an Indian cricketer
Mamta Chaudhary, a Nepali cricketer

Academia, science & scholarship
Arknath Chaudhary, a Sanskrit scholar and vice-chancellor of Shree Somnath Sanskrit University 
Ram Chet Chaudhary, an Indian agricultural scientist
Shamila N. Chaudhary, a foreign policy expert
Jai Bhagwan Chaudhary, a former Vice-Chancellor of Haryana Agricultural University

Journalism
Sudhir Chaudhary (journalist) , an Indian journalist, editor 
Omkar Chaudhary (1961-), an Indian journalist, writer, and editor

Other occupations
Nand Kishore Chaudhary (1953-), an Indian social entrepreneur
Chowdhury Krishnananda Dutta (1490-1570), a Vaishnava saint. 
Kanchan Chaudhary Bhattacharya, a former Director General of Police in Uttarakhand
Akshay Chandra Chowdhury (1850-1898), an Indian poet and novel writer
Puruesh Chaudhary (1983-), a futures researcher, development and strategic narrative professional

Aisha Chaudhary (1996–2015), a motivational speaker

Further disambiguation pages
Rajendra Chaudhary (disambiguation), several people
Sudhir Chaudhary (disambiguation), several people

Organisations
Chaudhary Group (CG Global), a multi-national conglomerate headquartered in Nepal
Chaudhary Charan Singh Post Graduate College, a college in Heonra-Saifai, Etawah
Chaudhary Ranbir Singh University, a university in Jind, Haryana
Chaudhary Bansi Lal University, a university in Bhiwani, Haryana
Chaudhary Charan Singh University, a university in Meerut, Uttar Pradesh
Chaudhary Devi Lal University, a university in Haryana
Dutta Chowdhury family, West Bengal, India.
Savarna Roy Chowdhury family, West Bengal, India.

Other
Chacha Chaudhary, an Indian comic book character
Chacha Chaudhary (2002 TV series), an Indian children's television series
Chaudhary Karnail Singh, a 1960 Indian Punjabi-language film
Chaudhary Charan Singh Airport, an international airport serving Lucknow
Chaudhary Charan Singh International Airport metro station in Lucknow

References

Surnames of Indian origin